

 
Warumunga is a locality in the Northern Territory of Australia located about  south-east of the territory capital of Darwin.

The locality’s name derived from the "Warumungu Land Trust" (sic), which make up a large part of the locality  Its boundaries and name were gazetted on 4 April 2007.

The 2016 Australian census which was conducted in August 2016 reports that Warumunga had 157 people living within its boundaries  of which 112	(69.6%) identified as Aboriginal and/or Torres Strait Islander people.

Warumunga is located within the federal Division of Lingiari, the territory electoral division of Barkly and the local government area of the Barkly Region.

See also
Nobles Nob mine

References

Notes

Citations

Aboriginal communities in the Northern Territory